In geometry, a circular algebraic curve is a type of plane algebraic curve determined by an equation F(x, y) = 0, where F is a polynomial with real coefficients and the highest-order terms of F form a polynomial divisible by x2 + y2. More precisely, if
F = Fn + Fn−1 + ... + F1 + F0, where each Fi is homogeneous of degree i, then the curve F(x, y) = 0 is circular if and only if Fn is divisible by x2 + y2.

Equivalently, if the curve is determined in homogeneous coordinates by G(x, y, z) = 0, where G is a homogeneous polynomial, then the curve is circular if and only if G(1, i, 0) = G(1, −i, 0) = 0. In other words, the curve is circular if it contains the circular points at infinity, (1, i, 0) and (1, −i, 0), when considered as a curve in the complex projective plane.

Multicircular algebraic curves
An algebraic curve is called p-circular if it contains the points (1, i, 0) and (1, −i, 0) when considered as a curve in the complex projective plane, and these points are singularities of order at least p. The terms bicircular, tricircular, etc. apply when p = 2, 3, etc. In terms of the polynomial F given above, the curve F(x, y) = 0 is p-circular if Fn−i is divisible by (x2 + y2)p−i when i < p. When p = 1 this reduces to the definition of a circular curve. The set of p-circular curves is invariant under Euclidean transformations. Note that a p-circular curve must have degree at least 2p.

 When k is 1 this says that the set of lines (0-circular curves of degree 1) together with the set of circles (1-circular curves of degree 2) form a set which is invariant under inversion.

Examples
 The circle is the only circular conic.
 Conchoids of de Sluze (which include several well-known cubic curves) are circular cubics.
 Cassini ovals (including the lemniscate of Bernoulli), toric sections and limaçons (including the cardioid) are bicircular quartics.
 Watt's curve is a tricircular sextic.

Footnotes

References
  "Courbe Algébrique Circulaire" at Encyclopédie des Formes Mathématiques Remarquables
  "Courbe Algébrique Multicirculaire" at Encyclopédie des Formes Mathématiques Remarquables
 Definition at 2dcurves.com

Curves
Analytic geometry